Tommy is an American police procedural crime drama television series created by Paul Attanasio that aired on CBS from February 6 to May 7, 2020. The series stars Edie Falco as the first female police chief of the Los Angeles Police Department. In May 2020, the series was canceled after one season.

Plot
The series centers around Abigail "Tommy" Thomas, played by Edie Falco, who becomes the first female Chief of Police for the LAPD. Tommy was a NYPD officer who came to office as a result of a federal judge's order to hire a female police chief. Tommy, who is divorced, has an adult daughter and grand-daughter living in LA. Tommy is gay, and ultimately comes out. She leads the LAPD as they fight crime every day in Los Angeles and her inner circle includes Donn Cooper a LAPD Commander who serves as Tommy's Chief Of Staff and her second in command, Blake Sullivan who is Tommy's Director Of Communications, Ken Rosey, a lawyer who help Tommy with her speeches and Abner Diaz a veteran LAPD Detective who is head of Tommy's Security Detail.

Cast and characters

Main

Edie Falco as LAPD Chief Abigail "Tommy" Thomas, a former NYPD captain notorious for accusing her superior of sexual misconduct, making her a feminist hero but also ruining her career. She is a lesbian. Tommy subsequently accepts Mayor Gray's offer to become the first female head of police in Los Angeles.
Michael Chernus as Ken Rosey, a lawyer and speechwriter who works with Tommy to manage her public image.
Adelaide Clemens as Blake Sullivan, Tommy's LAPD communications director.
Russell G. Jones as Donn Cooper, a Police Commander and was chief of staff to Tommy's predecessor. She chooses to retain him due to his reputation for giving honest advice.
Olivia Lucy Phillip as Kate Jones, Tommy's daughter, a school psychologist. She and her mother are trying to patch things up after years of estrangement.
Vladimir Caamaño as Abner Diaz, a LAPD Detective who is assigned as Tommy's driver and personal security detail.
Joseph Lyle Taylor as Deputy Mayor Doug Dudik, Mayor Gray's right-hand man.
Thomas Sadoski as Mayor Buddy Gray, who is forced to hire Tommy after a scandal involving the previous chief. He has a habit of being politically incorrect and always speaking his mind.

Recurring

 Tonye Patano as Mrs. Gates, Tommy's secretary. 
 Luke Jones as Henry, Kate's unfaithful husband. 
 Naledi Murray as Luna, Kate's daughter and Tommy's granddaughter. 
 Kurt Uy as Deputy Chief of Detectives Joe Kang. 
 Matt Dellapina as Vincent Siano, a journalist investigating the prison murder of a former campaign donor. 
 Katrina Lenk as Kiley Mills, an influential sports agent and romantic interest of Tommy's. 
 Sasha Diamond as Ashley Kim, Eric Decker's successor as Tommy's chief tech.

Guest
 Corbin Bernsen as Milton Leakey, Tommy's resentful predecessor as Chief of Police.
 Alexander Hodge as Eric Decker, Tommy's chief tech until he resigns over a disagreement about police surveillance.
 Philip Anthony-Rodriguez as Vice Commander Rascal Santos.
 Chelsea Ingram as Mayor's Assistant.

Episodes

Production

Development
On May 10, 2019, it was announced that the production had been given a series order. The series premiered on February 6, 2020. On May 6, 2020, CBS canceled the series after one season.

Casting
In February 2019, it was reported that Edie Falco, Michael Chernus, Russell G. Jones, Olivia Lucy Phillip, and Adelaide Clemens were cast in the pilot's lead roles. In March, it was announced that Joseph Lyle Taylor and David Fierro joined the cast in starring roles. On June 7, 2019, it was reported that Fierro, who was originally cast to play the male lead opposite of Falco in the series, had exited and his role would be recast. On August 5, 2019, Thomas Sadoski was cast as Buddy, replacing Fierro. On August 23, 2019, Vladimir Caamaño joined the cast as a series regular. On November 25, 2019, CBS announced that Katrina Lenk was cast in the recurring role of Kiley Mills. On January 20, 2020, Philip Anthony-Rodriguez was cast in a recurring role.

Filming
Despite the show being set in Los Angeles, the majority of the filming is done in New York City.

Release

Marketing
On May 15, 2019, CBS released the first official trailer for the series.

Reception

Critical response
On Rotten Tomatoes, the series holds an approval rating of 65% based on 20 reviews, with an average rating of 5.67/10. The website's critical consensus reads: "Though its tendency to settle for obvious answers doesn't do it any favors, Tommy remains a decent procedural thanks to a few twists and the endlessly watchable Edie Falco." On Metacritic, it has a weighted average score of 58 out of 100, based on 16 critics, indicating "mixed or average reviews".

Ratings

References

External links
 
 

2020 American television series debuts
2020 American television series endings
2020s American crime drama television series
2020s American LGBT-related drama television series
2020s American police procedural television series
CBS original programming
English-language television shows
Fictional portrayals of the Los Angeles Police Department
Lesbian-related television shows
Television shows filmed in New York (state)
Television shows set in Los Angeles
Television series by Amblin Entertainment
Television series by CBS Studios
Television series created by Paul Attanasio